Pogonomyrmex maricopa, the Maricopa harvester ant, is one of the most common species of harvester ant found in the U.S. state of Arizona, but it is also known from California, Colorado, New Mexico, Nevada, Texas and Utah, and the Mexican states of Baja California, Chihuahua, Sinaloa and Sonora. Its venom is believed to be the most toxic insect venom in the world.

Their nest mounds are likely to incorporate rocks and gravel. The ants construct cemented caps on the sand mound nests in a fine sand dune area. The caps are approximately 60% calcium carbonate that is transported from the underlying calcium carbonate layers, and protect the nest structure from being eroded away during high-wind periods. Partial erosion of the cemented caps adds calcium carbonate to the sand dune soils.

Venom and attack method 
The toxicity of the venom of the Maricopa harvester ant is well known. Its LD50 value is 0.12 mg/kg (injected intravenously in mice); 12 stings can kill a 2-kg rat. In comparison, the LD50 of the honey bee is 2.8 mg/kg—less than 1/20th as strong. In humans, a Pogonomyrmex sting produces intense pain that can last up to four hours.

Like that of many venomous insects, the venom of the Maricopa harvester ant consists of amino acids, peptides, and proteins.  This may also encompass alkaloids, terpenes, polysaccharides, biogenic amines, and organic acids. The most notable component found in the venom of the Maricopa harvester ant is an alkaloid poison—this releases an "alarm" pheromone that chemically alerts other ants in the vicinity. This is an example of chemical signaling, which explains why ants all appear to sting at once.

Similar to the two-part process of the fire ant bite and sting, the harvester ant will attach to the victim with its mandibles, and so proceed by pivoting around the site, allowing the ant to repeatedly sting and inject venom into the region.

The Maricopa harvester ant plays a major role in decomposition by dragging dead carcasses of insects underground, thereby enriching soil for plants and crops.

References

External links 

 
 Pogonomyrmex maricopa (Maricopa Harvester Ant) photos

maricopa
Hymenoptera of North America
Insects of Mexico
Insects of the United States
Fauna of the Sonoran Desert
Insects described in 1914
Taxa named by William Morton Wheeler